Augusta Lake is a lake in Cottonwood County, in the U.S. state of Minnesota.

Augusta Lake was named for the wife of an early settler.

References

Lakes of Minnesota
Lakes of Cottonwood County, Minnesota